Katherine Skelton (born 5 October 1987) is a competitor in synchronized swimming who represented Great Britain in the team event at the 2012 London Olympics.

References 

1987 births
Living people
British synchronised swimmers
Olympic synchronised swimmers of Great Britain
Synchronized swimmers at the 2012 Summer Olympics
Sportspeople from Reading, Berkshire